Senator Yates may refer to:

Abraham Yates Jr. (1724–1796), New York State Senate
Charles B. Yates (1939–2000), New Jersey State Senate
Richard Yates (politician, born 1815) (1815–1873), Illinois State Senate